Amalie Moosgaard and Cecilie Moosgaard are Danish twin fashion models.

Careers
The Moosgaards debuted exclusively as “the Prada twins” in 2015, deemed the most “coveted” job in modeling. Amalie is the older twin, and they were discovered in Aarhus, Denmark. The twins do most of their work together, but Amalie has also done separate work. They have also walked for brands such as Valentino, Alexander McQueen, Sonia Rykiel, and Vera Wang.

They have appeared in Numéro, Love, Dazed, Vogue Italia, and Interview.

References 

Year of birth missing (living people)
Living people
Danish twins
Twin models
Identical twins
People from Aarhus
Danish female models
Prada exclusive models